Chefa is the second studio album by German musician Miss Platnum. It was released on 25 May 2008 under the label Four Music. The album's first single Give Me The Food reached #11 of the Romanian charts. The album's second single Come Marry Me was released on 24 August 2007 and features German singer Peter Fox from the band Seeed.

Track listing

References

External links
Miss Platnum on Myspace

Miss Platnum albums
2007 albums